This is a list of notable websites that have been blocked or censored in Russia, including current and past blocks. The Federal Service for Supervision of Communications, Information Technology and Mass Media (Roskomnadzor) has maintained an official mandatory list since 2012. Websites can be blocked for obtaining child pornography, materials advocating drug abuse and drug production, items on the Federal List of Extremist Materials, or for violations of data retention and surveillance laws.

A number of websites that maintain lists of banned websites are currently blocked in Russia, based on different sources of information.

List

List of apps banned 

 WeChat was banned for a week in 2017.
 JW Library app was banned on March 31, 2021
 Alexei Navalny app
 Line (software)
 Spotify

See also 
 Media freedom in Russia
 Russian foreign agent law
 Great Firewall

References 

Russia
Internet censorship in Russia
Websites blocked
Blocked,Russia